This page provides the summaries of the CAF Second Round matches for 2014 FIFA World Cup qualification.

Format
The second round saw the top 28 ranked CAF teams joined by the 12 winners from the first round. These teams were drawn into ten groups of four teams, at the World Cup Preliminary Draw at the Marina da Glória in Rio de Janeiro, Brazil on 30 July 2011.

The matches were played from 1 June 2012 to 10 September 2013. The winners of each group advanced to the third round.

Seeding
The July 2011 FIFA World Ranking was used to seed the teams.

† First round winners whose identity was not known at the time of the draw

Groups

Note: Scores marked by * are results awarded by FIFA.

Group A

Group B

Group C

Group D

Group E

Group F

Group G

Group H

Group I

Group J

Goalscorers
There were 291 goals in 120 matches, for an average of 2.43 goals per match.
6 goals

 Mohamed Salah

5 goals

 Islam Slimani
 Mohamed Aboutrika
 Bernard Parker
 Saladin Said

4 goals

 Juvenal
 Asamoah Gyan
 Yaya Touré
 Papiss Cissé

3 goals

 Hillal Soudani
 Razak Omotoyossi
 Djaniny
 Pierre-Emerick Aubameyang
 Mohamed Yattara
 Wilfried Bony
 Salomon Kalou
 Youssef El-Arabi
 Oussama Darragi
 Jacob Mulenga
 Getaneh Kebede
 Emilio Nsue

2 goals

 Sofiane Feghouli
 Saphir Taïder
 Guilherme
 Rudy Gestede
 Ofentse Nato
 Jerome Ramatlhakwane
 Aristide Bancé
 Jonathan Pitroipa
 Prejuce Nakoulma
 Héldon Ramos
 Platini
 Eric Choupo-Moting
 Samuel Eto'o
 Foxi Kéthévoama
 Nicaise Zimbori-Auzingoni
 Mustapha Jarju
 Dominic Adiyiah
 Jordan Ayew
 Sulley Muntari
 Abdul Majeed Waris
 Sadio Diallo
 Ibrahima Traoré
 Didier Drogba
 Lacina Traoré
 Ahmed Zuway
 Mahamadou N'Diaye
 Mahamadou Samassa
 Houssine Kharja
 Meddie Kagere
 Sadio Mané
 Alhassan Kamara
 Sheriff Suma
 Amri Kiemba
 Mbwana Samata
 Thomas Ulimwengu
 Lalawélé Atakora
 Chadi Hammami
 Issam Jemâa
 Tony Mawejje
 Emmanuel Okwi
 Christopher Katongo
 Collins Mbesuma
 Knowledge Musona

1 goal

 Abdul
 Amaro
 Djalma
 Guedes
 Mabululu
 Job
 Nabil Ghilas
 Stéphane Sessègnon
 Bello Babatounde
 Mickaël Poté
 Mogakolodi Ngele
 Tebogo Sembowa
 Charles Kaboré
 Aurélien Chedjou
 Marco Soares
 Odaïr Fortes
 Babanco
 Salif Kéïta
 Dieumerci Mbokani
 Trésor Mputu
 Patou Ebunga-Simbi
 Chris Malonga
 Christopher Samba
 Fabrice N'Guessi
 Ulrich Kapolongo
 Amr Zaki
 Hosny Abd Rabo
 Mahmoud Fathallah
 Mohamed Zidan
 Hossam Ghaly
 Jimmy Bermúdez
 Randy
 Rincón
 Jônatas Obina
 Minyahil Teshome
 Rémy Ebanega
 Bruno Ecuele Manga
 Momodou Ceesay
 Abdou Jammeh
 Emmanuel Agyemang-Badu
 Jerry Akaminko
 Kwadwo Asamoah
 Christian Atsu
 John Boye
 Mubarak Wakaso
 Alhassane Bangoura
 Abdoul Camara
 Mohammed Diarra
 Seydouba Soumah
 Kolo Touré
 Francis Kahata
 Andrew Murunga
 David Owino
 Litsepe Marabe
 Tsepo Lekhoana
 Tsoanelo Koetle
 Tsepo Seturumane
 Francis Doe
 Anthony Laffor
 Patrick Wleh
 Marcus Macauley
 Hamed Snousi
 Faisal Al Badri
 John Banda
 Gabadinho Mhango
 Robin Ngalande
 Robert Ng'ambi
 Cheick Diabaté
 Modibo Maïga
 Abdou Traoré
 Hamza Abourazzouk
 Abdelaziz Barrada
 Younès Belhanda
 Abderrazak Hamdallah
 Domingues
 Maninho
 Henrico Botes
 Deon Kavendji
 Kamilou Daouda
 Mahamane Cissé
 Yacouba Ali
 Azubuike Egwuekwe
 Ahmed Musa
 Godfrey Oboabona
 Nnamdi Oduamadi
 Emmanuel Emenike
 Victor Moses
 Ikechukwu Uche
 Labama Bokota
 Ibrahima Baldé
 Dame N'Doye
 Moussa Sow
 Moustapha Bangura
 Teteh Bangura
 Samuel Barlay
 Kei Kamara
 Mohamed Kamara
 Ibrahim Kargbo
 Morgan Gould
 Katlego Mashego
 Thabo Matlaba
 Katlego Mphela
 Siphiwe Tshabalala
 Kermit Erasmus
 Dean Furman
 Bakri Almadina
 Mudather El Tahir
 Salah Ibrahim
 Muhannad El Tahir
 Saif Eldin Ali Idris Farah
 Shomari Kapombe
 Erasto Nyoni
 Kalen Damessi
 Dové Womé
 Komlan Amewou
 Backer Aloenouvo
 Fakhreddine Ben Youssef
 Wahbi Khazri
 Saber Khelifa
 Godfrey Walusimbi
 Nathan Sinkala
 Lincoln Zvasiya
 Masimba Mambare

1 own goal

 Adam El-Abd (playing against Guinea)
 Moses Chavula (playing against Kenya)
 Komlan Amewou (playing against Libya)
 Bernard Parker (playing against Ethiopia)

Notes

References

External links
Results and schedule (FIFA.com version)
Results and schedule (CAFonline.com version)

2014 FIFA World Cup qualification (CAF)
Qual
Qual